Stephanie Hagen (born August 26, 1979) is a retired American indoor volleyball player. 

She played for the United States women's national volleyball team, at the 2002 FIVB World Grand Prix.

Background
She was an All-American for University of Minnesota.

In 2008, she played beach volleyball with Erin Byrd.

References

External links
 
Women’s Volleyball Upsets No. 7 Minnesota In Five Games 

1979 births
Living people
American women's volleyball players
Minnesota Golden Gophers women's volleyball players
Middle blockers